Daviesia grahamii is a species of flowering plant in the family Fabaceae and is endemic to the interior of Western Australia. It is a multi-stemmed shrub with narrowly egg-shaped to linear phyllodes, and bright yellow to orange-yellow, dark red and maroon flowers.

Description

Taxonomy and naming
Daviesia grahamii was first formally described in 1984 by Alfred James Ewart and Jean White-Haney in the Proceedings of the Royal Society of Victoria from specimens collected by Max Koch in 1905. The specific epithet (grahamii) honours George Graham, Minister for Agriculture.

Distribution and habitat
This daviesia grows in spinifex hummock-grassland in arid areas of Western Australia between the Little Sandy Desert and the eastern edge of the wheatbelt.

Conservation status
Daviesia grahamii is listed as "not threatened" by the Department of Biodiversity, Conservation and Attractions.

References

grahamii
Eudicots of Western Australia
Plants described in 1909
Taxa named by Alfred James Ewart